The Vultures are a London based band, with band members originally from London, Quebec, Taiwan, Valencia, Japan and Newcastle, formed in 2013.  They won Best Alternative Act on the Exposure Music Awards 2013/2014.

References

External links

English alternative rock groups
Musical groups from London
Musical groups established in 2013
2013 establishments in England